

Winners

External links 
TVyNovelas at esmas.com
TVyNovelas Awards at the univision.com

Co-star